My Love is a 2021 Chinese romantic comedy film directed and co-written by Han Tian. It is a remake of the 2018 South Korean film On Your Wedding Day. The film stars Greg Hsu and Zhang Ruonan, and features Ding Guansen, Yan Zidong, Guo Cheng and Wang Shasha in supporting roles. The plot follows a story of first love, spanning fifteen years, from teenagers to adults. 

The film was released on April 30, 2021. It received mixed reviews from critics but was widely successful at the box office, making it the highest-grossing romantic comedy film of 2021 in China. The film has grossed over $114 million worldwide.

Plot 
Back in high school, Zhou Xiaoqi (Greg Hsu) was a student with swimming speciality. You Yongci (Zhang Ruonan) was a transfer student of the same high school. At the first sight, Zhou fell in love with You. Before Zhou expressed his true feelings, You left without saying goodbye. Zhou holds and protects this young and ignorant pure love inside his heart for over 15 years.

Cast

Production 
Principal photography began at the end of May 2020, at locations such as Fuzhou, Quanzhou, Xiamen, Zhangzhou in China and wrapped on July 28, 2020.

Release 
My Love premiered at the Saga Luxury Cinemas in Hangzhou on April 27, 2021, and was theatrically released in China on April 30, 2021. The film was released in Singapore on May 6 and in Brunei on May 13. Opening in theaters in North America, Australia and New Zealand starts from May 7. The film was released in Taiwan through streaming on July 9, and was released in South Korea theatrically on August 25. It had planned release date in Malaysia on May 6, and was delayed to September 16 in response to the COVID-19 pandemic.

Reception

Box office 
My Love grossed CN¥424 million (US$65.6 million) in its three day opening weekend in China.

Critical response 
On the Chinese review aggregator Maoyan, more than 650,000 audiences rated this film and the average rating is 8.0/10.

Lim Yian Lu from Singapore, reviewing the film for Yahoo Life, wrote: "Being a romance drama, the plot takes its audience through all the highs and lows of the couple’s love story. Although 115 minutes can be a little long, the details are well executed, lending depth to not only the characters, but also their relationship."

Accolades

References

2021 films
2021 romantic comedy-drama films
Chinese romantic comedy-drama films
Chinese teen films
2020s Mandarin-language films
Films set in 2006
Films set in 2008
Films set in 2009
Films set in 2015
Films set in 2016
Films set in 2017
Films set in 2021
Swimming films
Chinese remakes of South Korean films
Romance film remakes
Comedy film remakes
Drama film remakes
Beijing Enlight Pictures films
Films postponed due to the COVID-19 pandemic